In the 1839 Iowa Territory Council elections, electors selected councilors to serve in the second Iowa Territory Council. All 13 members of the Territory Council were elected. Councilors served one-year terms.

The Iowa Territory existed from July 4, 1838, until December 28, 1846, when Iowa was admitted to the Union as a state. At the time, the Iowa Territory had a Legislative Assembly consisting of an upper chamber (i.e., the Territory Council) and a lower chamber (i.e., the Territory House of Representatives).

Following the organization of the first Territory Council in 1838, Democrats held a majority with seven seats to Whigs' six seats.

To claim a majority of seats, the Whigs needed to net one seat from the Democrats.

The Democrats maintained a majority of seats in the Council following the 1839 general election with the balance of power remaining unchanged with the Democrats holding seven seats and the Whigs having six seats. Democratic Councilor Stephen P. Hempstead was chosen as the President of the second Territory Council to succeed Whig Councilor Jesse B. Browne in that leadership position.

Summary of Results 

Source:

Detailed Results
NOTE: The Iowa General Assembly does not contain detailed vote totals for Territory Council elections in 1839.

See also
 Elections in Iowa

External links
District boundaries for the Iowa Territory Council in 1839:
Iowa Territory Council Districts 1838-1840 map

References

Iowa Council
Iowa
Iowa Senate elections